Clément-Antoine Bayema (born July 9, 1988 in Douala) is a professional Cameroonian footballer currently playing for University of Ngaoundéré.

Career
He played previously for Cotonsport Garoua and Étoile du Congo.

International career
Bayema was called to the Cameroonian national team for play the 2009 CEMAC Cup.

Notes

1988 births
Living people
Cameroonian footballers
Coton Sport FC de Garoua players
Association football midfielders